Kwon Eun-som (born 13 November 1990) is a South Korean footballer who plays as a midfielder for WK League club Suwon FC and the South Korea women's national team.

International goals

References

1990 births
Living people
South Korean women's footballers
Women's association football midfielders
South Korea women's international footballers
Asian Games medalists in football
Footballers at the 2010 Asian Games
Asian Games bronze medalists for South Korea
Medalists at the 2010 Asian Games